The Silesian String Quartet is a string quartet founded in 1978 by the graduates of the Karol Szymanowski Academy of Music in Katowice, Poland. Its current members are:
 Szymon Krzeszowiec (violin I)
 Arkadiusz Kubica (violin II)
 Łukasz Syrnicki (viola)
 Piotr Janosik (cello)

History 
In 1978, graduates of the Karol Szymanowski Academy of Music in Katowice founded the Silesian String Quartet. They participated in masterclasses with such artists as, among others, the musicians of the LaSalle Quartet, Amadeus, Juilliard, Smetana and Alban Berg string quartets.

In 1993, the Silesian Quartet launched an annual chamber music festival held under the motto "Silesian Quartet and its guests".

Since 2005, the Self-Government of Gliwice has been the patron of The Silesian String Quartet and the Music Theatre of Gliwice has been its partner.

Performances

Festivals 
The ensemble performed at numerous festivals, including: Berliner Musiktage, Time of Music in Viitasaari (Finland), Kuhmo Chamber Music Festival (Finland), West Cork Chamber Music Festival (Ireland), Festiv´Alpes in Grenoble (France), Inventionen in Berlin, Musicorama in Hong Kong, Festival de Saint-Denis in Paris, Wien Modern (Austria), EuroArt in Prague (Czech Republic), Contemporary Music Festival Melos-Etos in Bratislava (Slovakia), Musique de Amitié Festival in Biel, Bornholms-Musik Festival, Musikhost in Odense and the World Music Days in Amsterdam, Warsaw Autumn (Poland), Penderecki Festival in Kraków (Poland), Poznań Music Spring (Poland), the Polish Contemporary Music Festival in Wrocław (Poland), Tongyeong International Music Festival (South Korea).

Concert halls 
The Silesian String Quartet has given over 1000 concerts, attracting enthusiastic critical response, in many European countries, as well as the United States, Canada, Mexico, Japan and Hong Kong. 
It has appeared at some of the world´s most prestigious concert halls including Concertgebouw in Amsterdam, Konzerthaus in Vienna, Vredenburg in Utrecht, De Unie in Rotterdam, De Singel in Antwerp, Schauspielhaus in Berlin, Tivoli in Copenhagen, Tonhalle in Düsseldorf, Wigmore Hall in London, Salle Pleyel in Paris, Merkin Hall and Carnegie Hall in New York City and Jordan Hall in Boston. The Silesian String Quartet also worked with radio stations in Germany (RIAS, SFB, WDR), the Netherlands (NOS), Greece and the Czech Republic.

Cooperation 
The Silesian String Quartet performed with other eminent artists such as: Dmitri Ashkenazy, Andrzej Bauer, Eduard Brunner, Bruno Canino, Martin Frost, Stefan Kamasa, Jadwiga Kotnowska, Eugeniusz Knapik, Karri Krikku, Waldemar Malicki, Jerzy Marchwiński, Janusz Olejniczak, Piotr Pławner, Ewa Pobłocka, Ewa Podleś, Jadwiga Rappe, Hokan Rosengren, Jan Stanienda, Hary Sparnay, Wojciech Świtała, Marie-Pierre Langlamet, Krystian Zimerman.

Repertoire 
The Silesian String Quartet's repertoire includes over 300 pieces of chamber literature, of which almost 200 were written by 20th-century composers. More than 100 works, by Polish and foreign composers, were premiered by the Silesian String Quartet. These were, among other works:
 Rafał Augustyn – String quartet no. 2 (with flute, 1983)
 Stanisław Krupowicz – Only Beatrix (with tape, 1989)
 Grażyna Krzanowska – String quartets nos. 2 and 3
 Andrzej Krzanowski – Relief no. 9 (with tape, 1989), Reminiscenza B
 Aleksander Lasoń – String quartets nos. 2, 6 and 7
 Edward Sielicki – String quartet
 Witold Szalonek – Inside? Outside? (with bass clarinet); Symphony of rituals  (2002)
 Paweł Szymański – Five pieces for string quartet (1992)
 Eugeniusz Knapik – String quartet (1980)
 VSTO [version 1] – String quartet (1989)

Awards and decorations
The Silesian Quartet was awarded many prizes at international musical competitions got a number of Polish awards and decorations, including:
2008 Medal for Merit to Culture - Gloria Artis
2005: "CD of the year 2005", « Hi-Fi Muzyka» Magazine (the album « Republique »)
2002:  Warsaw Autumn Music Award "Orfeusz"
1999: Gold Cross of Merit (Poland)
1998: honorary badge Meritorious Activist of Culture
1996, 1998, 2005: Polish CD Award "Fryderyk" for recordings of works by Henryk Mikołaj Górecki, Witold Lutosławski, Karol Szymanowski and Ernest Chausson
1992: Mayor of Katowice’s Artistic Award
1990: Stanisław Wyspiański Award for Young Artists
1988: Katowice Province Governor Artistic Award
1984, 1988: UNESCO International Composers´ Rostrum for the recording of string quartets by Eugeniusz Knapik and Aleksander Lasoń
1981: Poznań Music Spring (1981)
1979: Contemporary Music Competition in Kraków

Discography

References

Musical groups established in 1978
Polish musical groups
String quartets
Recipient of the Meritorious Activist of Culture badge